Cleveland Street District is a national historic district located at Durham, Durham County, North Carolina. The district encompasses 16 contributing buildings and 1 contributing structure in a predominantly residential section of Durham. The buildings primarily date between the 1880s and 1910s and include notable examples of Queen Anne  and Stick Style / Eastlake movement architecture.  Notable contributing buildings include the Holloway-Hutchins House and Howerton-Masser House (c. 1890).

It was listed on the National Register of Historic Places in 1985.

References

Historic districts on the National Register of Historic Places in North Carolina
Queen Anne architecture in North Carolina
Historic districts in Durham, North Carolina
National Register of Historic Places in Durham County, North Carolina
Neighborhoods in Durham, North Carolina